Hanna "Hannerl" Walter (born 24 November 1939) is an Austrian figure skater. She is the 1959 European champion and World silver medalist. She represented Austria at the 1956 Winter Olympics, where she placed 7th.

Competitive highlights

References 

 
 
 

1939 births
Living people
Austrian female single skaters
Olympic figure skaters of Austria
Figure skaters at the 1956 Winter Olympics
World Figure Skating Championships medalists
European Figure Skating Championships medalists